"Where Are You Going, Billy Boy" is a song written by Dave Kirby and Glenn Martin. It was first recorded as a duet by American country artists Bill Anderson and Mary Lou Turner. It was released as a single in 1977 via MCA Records and became a major hit the same year.

Background and release
"Where Are You Going, Billy Boy" was recorded in March 1977 at Bradley's Barn, located in Mount Juliet, Tennessee. The session was produced by Buddy Killen. It was the pair's first production assignment with Killen.

"Where Are You Going, Billy Boy" was released as a single by MCA Records in June 1977. The song spent 12 weeks on the Billboard Hot Country Singles before reaching number 18 in September 1977. It was the pair's second top ten hit together and second to be spawned off the same studio album. In Canada, the single reached number 22 on the RPM Country Songs chart in 1977. It was first released on their 1977 studio album, Billy Boy & Mary Lou.

Track listings
7" vinyl single
 "Where Are You Going, Billy Boy" – 2:37
 "Sad Ole Shade of Gray" – 2:18

Chart performance

References

1977 singles
1977 songs
Bill Anderson (singer) songs
MCA Records singles
Mary Lou Turner songs
Male–female vocal duets